Acalymma blandulum is a species of skeletonizing leaf beetle in the family Chrysomelidae. It is found in the United States and Mexico.

Subspecies
There are three subspecies of Acalymma blandulum:

 A. blandulum blandulum (J. L. LeConte, 1868) – United States: Arizona, Colorado, Kansas, New Mexico, Oklahoma, Texas; Mexico: Chiapas, Chihuahua, Coahuila, Durango, Oaxaca, Querétaro, San Luis Potosí, Tamaulipas, Veracruz, Zacatecas.
 A. blandulum nigriventre Munroe & Smith, 1980 – Mexico: Chihuahua, Durango, Jalisco, Mexico, Zacatecas.
 A. blandulum yucatanense Munroe & Smith, 1980 – Mexico: Campeche, Quintana Roo, Yucatán.

References

Further reading

 
 
 
 
 

Galerucinae
Beetles described in 1868
Taxa named by John Lawrence LeConte
Beetles of North America